Bryan Hayes (born October 8, 1958) is a Canadian politician. He was elected to the House of Commons of Canada for the federal Conservative Party of Canada in the 2011 election, representing the Sault Ste. Marie riding.

Background
Hayes was born in Marville, France, where his father was stationed as a member of the Canadian Armed Forces. He moved to Sault Ste. Marie with his wife after graduating with honours from the marketing program at Cambrian College. Hayes also holds a degree in accounting from Laurentian University, is a Certified General Accountant and a member of the Certified General Accountants of Ontario.

Hayes has served on Sault Ste. Marie City Council, and has been an active participant on many boards, including the District Social Services Administration Board, the Sault and Area Hospital Board of Directors, and the Sault Ste. Marie Downtown Association.

Electoral record

References

External links
 Official website
 

1958 births
Conservative Party of Canada MPs
Laurentian University alumni
Living people
Members of the House of Commons of Canada from Ontario
Sault Ste. Marie, Ontario city councillors
Cambrian College alumni
21st-century Canadian politicians